The Ambassador Extraordinary and Plenipotentiary of the Russian Federation to Bosnia and Herzegovina is the official representative of the President and the Government of the Russian Federation to the Presidency and the Government of Bosnia and Herzegovina.

The ambassador and his staff work at large in the Embassy of Russia in Sarajevo.

History of diplomatic relations

With the breakup of Yugoslavia in 1992, the Russian Federation recognized the independence of Bosnia and Herzegovina on 27 April 1992, with diplomatic relations established on 26 December 1996.

Representatives of the Russian Federation to Bosnia and Herzegovina (1996 – present)

References

 
Bosnia and Herzegovina
Russia